Luzón is a municipality of Spain located in the province of Guadalajara, autonomous communityy of Castile-La Mancha. According to the 2012 census of the INE, the municipality has a population of only 79 inhabitants, having undergone a severe population decline since the last half of the twentieth century.

Location

Luzón is located on top of a small hillock peaked by the parish church which is dedicated to Saint Peter the Apostle and belongs to the Roman Catholic Diocese of Sigüenza-Guadalajara.

This town lies in the Tajuña river valley, at the feet of the Sierra de Solorio range, Sistema Ibérico. The nearest towns are Anguita to the west and Maranchón to the east.

See also
List of municipalities in Guadalajara

References

External links

Luzón, mi pueblo
 Luzon, Guadalajara - Clubrural
 Diablos de Luzón. En el País de los luzones (Guadalajara)

Municipalities in the Province of Guadalajara